Arzuiyeh (also romanized as Arzū’īyeh, Arzoo’eyeh, Orzū’īyeh, ‘Orsū’īyeh, and Ozū’īyeh; also known as Ārzū) is a city and capital of Arzuiyeh County, in Kerman Province, Iran.  At the 2006 census, its population was 5,668, in 1,286 families.

History
It was part of Baft County until 1997, and with separating and stablishing the Arzuiyeh County in that year which included merging some villages like Shahmaran, it became the capital of Arzuiyeh County.

References

Populated places in Arzuiyeh County

Cities in Kerman Province